Pokhara Engineering College (PEC) is a technical institute established in 1999 CE in Pokhara, Nepal. It has been promoting engineering and developing career of students for several year. It offers education in different levels and programs. Its diploma programs (sub- overseer and I.E.) run under the affliction of CTEVT and its B.E and Master run under the affiliation of Pokhara University.

Principal 
Ar. Rojana Joshi is the Acting Principal  of Pokhara Engineering College(PEC)

Academic personnel 
Er. Suraj Basant Tulachan  -  Head Of Department - Computer & Electronics

Er. Bimal Bhandari - Head Of Department - Civil

Er. Saroj Giri  -- Research & Development Head

Er. Jayesh Chalise  - Diploma Coordinator

Programmers offered

Under Graduate (4 year degrees) 

 B.E.    Computer Science and Engineering
 B.E.    Electronics and Communication Engineering
 B.E.    ARCH. ENGINEERING
 B.E     Civil Engineering

Post Graduate 

 M E Construction Engineering and Management

See also 
 List of universities and colleges in Nepal

See also 
PEC official website

Engineering universities and colleges in Nepal
1999 establishments in Nepal
Education in Pokhara